The Six Days of Rio de Janeiro was a six-day cycling event, held in Rio de Janeiro. The event was only held once, in August 1956, won by Italian-Argentine team Severino Rigoni and Bruno Sivilotti.

Roll of honour

References

Cycle races in Brazil
International cycle races hosted by Brazil
Velodromes in Brazil
Six-day races
1956 in track cycling
Defunct cycling races in Brazil